Allendale High School  is located in Allendale, Michigan, in the United States, in the Allendale Public School District, serving grades 9–12.

History

Construction on the current school building began in late 1995 and finished in early August 1997. Before construction, students at the high school level would attend school at the prior building on Lake Michigan Drive. This building housed all twelve grades under one roof, until decision came that the public school district would vote to build a middle school/high school along 68th Avenue for students in sixth through twelfth grade. The middle school/high school has since become a high school only building with the construction of a new middle school. The high school was constructed of one rural building, with the addition of a high school auditorium and a gym located south of the auditorium. The classroom hallways stretch onto two levels of the northwest section of the school.  The school built an auditorium which finished construction on April 16, 2005, naming it the Ceglerek Fine Arts Center (CFAC). Since opening, the CFAC has been home to several wonderful performances. With 789 seats and a spacious stage, the CFAC has the feel of a large auditorium with the intimacy of a small house.

In 2003, the district began building brand new athletic facilities, including locker rooms, in the south entrance wing, next to the gymnasium.  The athletic department also sponsored a new weight room and student and staff parking lots outside the athletic entrances. With the renovations, the school remodeled the basketball gym and renamed it Coach Ken Pierce Court, after former Allendale basketball coach, Ken Pierce. In 2014, the school remodeled Falcon Stadium outside Allendale High School, replacing the old track with a new rubber track, and a brand new football field.

Athletics
Allendale High School's nickname is The Falcons. Most teams compete in the Ottawa-Kent Conference Blue Division. Allendale currently offers the following sports:

 Baseball (boys)
 Basketball (boys and girls)
 Bowling (boys and girls)
Competitive cheer (girls) 
 Cross Country (boys and girls)
Boys state champion - 1999
 Football (boys)
 Golf (boys and girls)
 Hockey (boys)(co-op with Hudsonville)
 Softball (girls)
 Soccer (boys and girls)
 Track & Field (boys and girls)
 Volleyball (girls)
 Wrestling (boys)
 AHS Chamber Choir
 AHS Select Women's Ensemble 
 AHS Marching band 
 AHS Jazz Band

References

External links
Allendale High School website 
Allendale Public Schools website

Public high schools in Michigan
Allendale, Michigan
Schools in Ottawa County, Michigan
1997 establishments in Michigan